Comedy Central is a French pay television channel operated by Paramount France.

History 
Comedy Central was launched in France on 4 October 2018, along with the launch of a French digital content division for social medias, Viacom Digital Studios France.

On 8 October 2019, Comedy Central joined Canal+.

Comedy Central and Paramount Channel were launched in Belgium on 7 April 2020 on VOO, on 14 April on Telenet and on 1 January 2021 on Proximus.

Programming 
Comedy Central broadcast comedy shows and series. Comedy Central France premiered many Comedy Central shows in French, and offers many programmes in simulcast with the United States (The Daily Show, South Park, Crank Yankers...).

In mornings, Comedy Central airs cartoons (Sanjay and Craig and Hey Arnold!). In most of its daily and night-time, Comedy Central airs shows (Takeshi's Castle, The World's Funniest Moments, Punk'd) and a few series (How I Met Your Mother, The Fresh Prince of Bel-Air). Films are sometimes shown in evening.

References 

Comedy Central
Television channels and stations established in 2018
Television stations in France
2018 establishments in France